A heat wave, or heatwave, or extreme heat, is a period of excessively hot weather, which may be accompanied by high humidity, especially in oceanic climate countries.  While definitions vary, a heat wave is usually measured relative to the usual climate in the area and relative to normal temperatures for the season. Temperatures that people from a hotter climate consider normal can be called a heat wave in a cooler area if they are outside the normal climate pattern for that area. 

The term is applied both to hot weather variations and to extraordinary spells of hot weather which may occur only once a century. Severe heat waves have caused catastrophic crop failures, thousands of deaths from hyperthermia, increased risk of wildfires in areas with drought, and widespread power outages due to increased use of air conditioning. A heat wave is considered extreme weather, and poses danger to human health because heat and sunlight overwhelm the human body's cooling system.  Heat waves can usually be detected using forecasting instruments so that a warning can be issued.  

Heatwaves often have complex effects on human economies, due to less productivity of workers, disruption of agricultural and industrial processes and damage to infrastructure not adapted for extreme heat. 

Heatwaves have become more frequent, and over land more intense, almost everywhere since the 1950s, due to climate change.

Definitions 
There are several quite similar definitions of heat waves:

 The IPCC defines heat wave as "a period of abnormally hot weather, often defined with reference to a relative temperature threshold, lasting from two days to months."
The same definition is used by the World Meteorological Organization.
 A definition from the Glossary of Meteorology is: "A period of abnormally and uncomfortably hot and usually humid weather."

Definitions by country

Europe 
In the Netherlands, a heat wave is defined as a period of at least five consecutive days in which the maximum temperature in De Bilt exceeds , provided that on at least three days in this period the maximum temperature in De Bilt exceeds . This definition of a heat wave is also used in Belgium (with Ukkel as reference point) and Luxembourg.

In Denmark, a national heat wave (hedebølge) is defined as a period of at least 3 consecutive days of which period the average maximum temperature across more than fifty percent of the country exceeds  – the Danish Meteorological Institute further defines a "warmth wave" (varmebølge) when the same criteria are met for a  temperature, while in Sweden, a heat wave is defined as at least five days in a row with a daily high exceeding .

In the United Kingdom, the Met Office operates a Heat Health Watch system which places each Local Authority region into one of four levels. Heatwave conditions are defined by the maximum daytime temperature and minimum nighttime temperature rising above the threshold for a particular region. The length of time spent above that threshold determines the particular level. Level 1 is normal summer conditions. Level 2 is reached when there is a 60% or higher risk that the temperature will be above the threshold levels for two days and the intervening night. Level 3 is triggered when the temperature has been above the threshold for the preceding day and night, and there is a 90% or higher chance that it will stay above the threshold in the following day. Level 4 is triggered if conditions are more severe than those of the preceding three levels.  Each of the first three levels is associated with a particular state of readiness and response by the social and health services, and Level 4 is associated with more widespread response.

Other regions 
In the United States, definitions also vary by region, usually meaning a period of at least two or more days of excessively hot weather. In the Northeast, a heat wave is typically defined as three consecutive days where the temperature reaches or exceeds , but not always as this ties in with humidity levels to determine a heat index threshold. The same does not apply to drier climates. A heat storm is a Californian term for an extended heat wave. Heat storms occur when the temperature reaches  for three or more consecutive days over a wide area (tens of thousands of square miles). The National Weather Service issues heat advisories and excessive heat warnings when unusual periods of hot weather are expected.

The Australian Bureau of Meteorology defines a heat wave as "three days or more of maximum and minimum temperatures that are unusual for the location". Until the introduction of this new Pilot Heatwave Forecast there was no national definition that described heatwave or measures of heatwave severity.

Observations 

A general indicator that allows comparing heat waves in different regions of the World, characterized by different climates, was published in 2015. This was used to estimate heat waves occurrence at the global scale from 1901 to 2010, finding a substantial and sharp increase in the number of affected areas in the last two decades.

June 2019 was the hottest month on record worldwide, the effects of this were especially prominent in Europe. Increased wildfires in places such as Spain can also be attributed to heat waves.

The 2021 Western North America heat wave resulted in some of the highest temperatures ever recorded in the region, including , the highest temperature ever measured in Canada.

A study that investigated 13,115 cities found that extreme heat exposure of a wet bulb globe temperature above 30 °C tripled between 1983 and 2016. It increased by ~50% when the population growth in these cities is not taken into account. Urban areas and living spaces are often significantly warmer than surrounding rural areas, partly due to the urban heat island effect. The researchers compiled a comprehensive inventory of past urban extreme heat events.

Causes 
Heat waves form when high pressure aloft (from ) strengthens and remains over a region for several days up to several weeks. This is common in summer (in both Northern and Southern Hemispheres) as the jet stream 'follows the sun'. On the equator side of the jet stream, in the upper layers of the atmosphere, is the high pressure area.

Summertime weather patterns are generally slower to change than in winter. As a result, this upper level high pressure also moves slowly. Under high pressure, the air subsides (sinks) toward the surface, warming and drying adiabatically, inhibiting convection and preventing the formation of clouds. Reduction of clouds increases shortwave radiation reaching the surface. A low pressure at the surface leads to surface wind from lower latitudes that brings warm air, enhancing the warming. Alternatively, the surface winds could blow from the hot continental interior towards the coastal zone, leading to heat waves there, or from a high elevation towards low elevation, enhancing the subsidence and therefore the adiabatic warming. 

In the Eastern United States a heat wave can occur when a high pressure system originating in the Gulf of Mexico becomes stationary just off the Atlantic Seaboard (typically known as a Bermuda High). Hot humid air masses form over the Gulf of Mexico and the Caribbean Sea while hot dry air masses form over the desert Southwest and northern Mexico. The SW winds on the back side of the High continue to pump hot, humid Gulf air northeastward resulting in a spell of hot and humid weather for much of the Eastern States.

In the Western Cape Province of South Africa, a heat wave can occur when a low pressure offshore and high pressure inland air combine to form a Bergwind. The air warms as it descends from the Karoo interior, and the temperature will rise about 10 °C from the interior to the coast. Humidities are usually very low, and the temperatures can be over 40 °C in summer. The highest official temperatures recorded in South Africa (51.5 °C) was recorded one summer during a bergwind occurring along the Eastern Cape coastline.

The role of soil moisture can also contribute to the intensification of heat waves in Europe. Low soil moisture leads to a number of complex feedback mechanisms, which can in turn result in increased surface temperatures. One of the main mechanisms is reduced evaporative cooling of the atmosphere. When water evaporates, it consumes energy and thus will lower the surrounding temperature. If the soil is very dry, then incoming radiation from the sun will warm the air with little or no cooling effect from moisture evaporating from the soil.

Climate change

Impacts on human health

Heat-related health impacts for vulnerable people

Mortality

Underreporting of fatalities 
The number of heat fatalities is likely highly underreported due to a lack of reports and misreports. When factoring in heat-related illnesses, actual death tolls linked to extreme heat may be six times as high as official figures, as suggested for California and Japan. 

Part of the mortality observed during a heat wave can be attributed to short-term forward mortality displacement. It has been observed that for some heat waves, there is a compensatory decrease in overall mortality during the subsequent weeks after a heat wave. Such compensatory reductions in mortality suggest that heat affects especially those so ill that they "would have died in the short term anyway".

Another explanation for underreporting is the social attenuation in most contexts of heat waves as a health risk. As shown by the deadly French heat wave in 2003, heat wave dangers result from the intricate association of natural and social factors. Social invisibility is one such factor. In places where heat-related deaths often occur indoors, among elderly people living alone, it can be challenging to assign heat as a contributing factor.

Heat index for temperature and relative humidity

The heat index (as shown in the table above) is a measure of how hot it feels when relative humidity is factored with the actual air temperature.

Psychological and sociological effects 
In addition to physical stress, excessive heat causes psychological stress, to a degree which affects performance, and is also associated with an increase in violent crime. High temperatures are associated with increased conflict both at the interpersonal level and at the societal level. In every society, crime rates go up when temperatures go up, particularly violent crimes such as assault, murder, and rape. Furthermore, in politically unstable countries, high temperatures are an aggravating factor that lead toward civil wars.

Additionally, high temperatures have a significant effect on income. A study of counties in the United States found that economic productivity of individual days declines by about 1.7% for each degree Celsius above .

Surface ozone (air pollution) 
Ozone pollution in urban areas is especially concerning with increasing temperatures, raising heat-related mortality during heat waves. During heat waves in urban areas, ground level ozone pollution can be 20% higher than usual. 

One study concluded that from 1860 to 2000, the global population-weighted fine particle concentrations increased by 5% and near-surface ozone concentrations by 2% due to climate change.

An investigation to assess the joint mortality effects of ozone and heat during the European heat waves in 2003, concluded that these appear to be additive.

Other impacts

Reduced GDP 
Calculations from 2022 suggest heatwaves will cause  ~1% decrease of GDP to economies by mid 21st century.

Heatwaves often have complex effects on human economies, due to less productivity of workers, disruption of agricultural and industrial processes and damage to infrastructure not adapted for extreme heat.

Reduced agricultural yields 

Heat waves significantly threaten agricultural production. This and a late rain season resulted in significant tea leaf scorching and reduced yields.

Wildfires 
If a heat wave occurs during a drought, which dries out vegetation, it can contribute to bushfires and wildfires. High end farmlands have irrigation systems to back up crops with. Heat waves cause wildfires.

Floods 
Heat waves can also contribute to severe flooding. The record-breaking heat wave that afflicted Pakistan beginning in May 2022 led to glacier melt and moisture flow, which were factors in the devastating floods that began in June and claimed over 1,100 lives.

Infrastructural damage 
Heat waves can and do cause roads and highways to buckle and melt, water lines to burst, and power transformers to detonate, causing fires. Heat waves can also damage rail roads, such as buckling and kinking rails, which can lead to slower traffic, delays, and even cancellations of service when rails are too dangerous to traverse by trains.

Power outages 
Heat waves often lead to electricity spikes due to increased air conditioning use, which can create power outages, exacerbating the problem. During the 2006 North American heat wave, thousands of homes and businesses went without power, especially in California. In Los Angeles, electrical transformers failed, leaving thousands without power for as long as five days.
The 2009 South Eastern Australia Heat Wave caused the city of Melbourne, Australia to experience some major power disruptions which left over half a million people without power as the heat wave blew transformers and overloaded a power grid.

Options for reducing impacts of heat waves on people

Reducing urban heat island effect

Using air conditioning and other cooling systems 
One public health measure taken during heat waves is the setting-up of air-conditioned public cooling centers. There are novel designs for cooling systems that are relatively low-cost, do not use electrical components, are off-grid and chemically store solar energy for on-demand use.

Adding air conditioning in schools provides a cooler work place but results in additional greenhouse gas emissions unless solar energy is used.

Examples by country

United States 
In July 2019, over 50 million people in the United States were present in a jurisdiction with any type of heat advisory. Scientists predicted that in the days following the issuance of these warnings, many records for highest low temperatures will be broken: i.e. the lowest temperature in a 24-hour period will be higher than any low temperature measured before.

According to estimates of a 2022 study, 107 million people in the US will experience extremely dangerous heat in the year 2053.

Heat waves are the most lethal type of weather phenomenon in the United States. Between 1992 and 2001, deaths from excessive heat in the United States numbered 2,190, compared with 880 deaths from floods and 150 from hurricanes. The average annual number of fatalities directly attributed to heat in the United States is about 400. The 1995 Chicago heat wave, one of the worst in US history, led to approximately 739 heat-related deaths over a period of 5 days. In the United States, the loss of human life in hot spells in summer exceeds that caused by all other weather events combined, including lightning, rain, floods, hurricanes, and tornadoes. 

About 6,200 Americans are hospitalized each summer (data from 2008) due to excessive heat, and those at highest risk are poor, uninsured or elderly.

Research in the United States suggests that the relationship between extreme temperature and mortality varies by location. Heat is more likely to increase the risk of mortality in cities in the northern part of the country than in the southern regions of the country. For example, when Chicago, Denver, or New York City experience unusually hot summertime temperatures, elevated levels of illness and death are predicted. In contrast, parts of the country that are mild to hot year-round have a lower public health risk from excessive heat. Research shows that residents of southern cities, such as Miami, Tampa, Los Angeles, and Phoenix, tend to be acclimated to hot weather conditions and therefore less vulnerable to heat related deaths. However, as a whole, people in the United States appear to be adapting to hotter temperatures further north each decade, although this might be due to better infrastructure, more modern building design, and better public awareness.

Society and culture 
Policy makers, funders and researchers have created the Extreme Heat Resilience Alliance coalition under the Atlantic Council to advocate for naming heatwaves, measuring them, and ranking them to build better awareness of their impacts.

See also 
 Cold wave
 List of heat waves
 List of severe weather phenomena
 Urban heat island

References

External links 
Current global map of extreme temperatures
 Social & Economic Costs of Temperature Extremes from NOAA Socioeconomics website initiative, National Centers for Environmental Information

 
Meteorological phenomena
Natural disasters
Torridness
Weather events
Weather hazards